Carineta is a genus of cicadas in the family Cicadidae.

Species
Selected species within this genus include:
 Carineta maculosa Torres, 1948
 Carineta diardi (Guerin-Meneville, 1829)
 Carineta illustris (Distant, 1905)
 Carineta lichiana (Boulard, 1985)   
 Carineta rufescens (Fabricius 1803)

References 

Carinetini
Cicadidae genera